The 54th government of Turkey governed Turkey from 28 June 1996 to 30 June 1997. It was a coalition government formed by Welfare Party (RP) and True Path Party (DYP), and was known as Refahyol (a portmanteau of the Turkish names of the two parties in the coalition).

Background
After the fall of the 53rd government of Turkey, in which True Path Party (DYP) was one of the participants, Welfare Party (RP) and True Path Party (DYP) formed a coalition government.

Initially, Necmettin Erbakan of Welfare Party was the prime minister and Tansu Çiller of True Path Party was the deputy prime minister. After two years, they were to rotate in the position. However, the DYP was the third-largest in the parliament, and when Erbakan stepped down to begin the rotation, President Süleyman Demirel asked Mesut Yılmaz, leader of the Motherland Party which was the second-largest, to form the new government instead.

Government
In the list below, the serving period of cabinet members who served only a part of the cabinet's lifespan are shown in the column "Notes".

Aftermath
Necmettin Erbakan resigned as prime minister, hoping his coalition partner Tansu Çiller would be the next prime minister and a similar government would be formed. However, president Süleyman Demirel appointed Mesut Yılmaz of Motherland Party as the new prime minister
(see Prime ministership of Necmettin Erbakan).

This government dissolved under the pressure from the military.

References

Cabinets of Turkey
Welfare Party politicians
Democrat Party (Turkey, current) politicians
1996 establishments in Turkey
1997 disestablishments in Turkey
Cabinets established in 1996
Cabinets disestablished in 1997
Coalition governments of Turkey
Rotation governments
Members of the 54th government of Turkey
Welfare Party